Total Madness is a 2009 compilation CD/DVD album by Madness, released by Union Square Music. It is principally a singles collection, though it also includes two album tracks from their debut album, One Step Beyond.... On release in the UK it reached #11 in the Official Album Charts, making it Madness' second hit album of 2009, the second being The Liberty of Norton Folgate (#5).

Due to licensing problems, none of the four singles that Madness released on Zarjazz Records in 1985-86 are included.

The album effectively supersedes the now deleted Divine Madness collection. Total Madness should not be confused with the earlier US-only Total Madness — The Very Best of Madness.

Promotion

Union Square put significant effort into the album's promotion. As well as a TV advert campaign, a large billboard featuring the album's cover was erected on Hanger Lane in London. In addition, there was a flyering campaign during the band's performance at Regent Street festival, and also an old AEC Routemaster bus was recommissioned and redecorated to match the vehicle on the album cover. This bus made several appearances on Madness' 2009 Christmas Tour. This makes Total Madness one of the most heavily promoted Madness albums since their reunion in 1992.

Track listing

The collection comprises a CD and DVD sold as a single package.

DVD - The music videos
The DVD contains the same 23 tracks, and in the same order, as the CD.

Charts

Certifications and sales

References

External links

2009 compilation albums
2009 video albums
Music video compilation albums
Madness (band) compilation albums
Madness (band) video albums
Albums produced by Clive Langer
Albums produced by Alan Winstanley